Moorhead is an unincorporated community in southern Powder River County, Montana, United States.

Climate
According to the Köppen Climate Classification system, Moorhead has a semi-arid climate, abbreviated "BSk" on climate maps.

History

American Indian Wars 
On September 13, 1865, Colonel Nelson D. Cole's and Lieutenant Colonel Samuel Walker's columns of the Powder River Expedition marched past the future site of Moorhead.

The Town 
Moorhead was established in 1892, in Custer County, and was originally named Franklin. In 1898, Bryon Kelsey changed the name of the town to Moorhead after Annis P. Moorhead, who homesteaded at the town. The first store in Moorhead was established in 1900 by Bryon Kelsey. In 1919, Moorhead became part of the newly created Powder River County, with the town of Broadus as the county seat. The town's post office moved several times. In the 1930s Moorhead's first car bridge over the Powder River was built, although in the spring of 1948 the two-lane bridge was washed out by a flood. By 1949 there was one post office, one store, one schoolhouse (that also served as a church and dance hall), one saloon, and one filling station. At this time, a dam was proposed to be built on the Powder River at Moorhead. But in the 1950s when the Moorhead dam project deteriorated the businesses began to close. In 1956, a footbridge was built across the Powder at Moorhead, and was used to carry mail three times a week. Then in 1972, a second car bridge was built beside the footbridge. Moorhead Rancher George Fulton moved the store and post office to the Fultons' property, one mile north of their original location on the Moorhead road, and placed them near the old Moorhead schoolhouse. His son Hugh now owns these three remaining buildings. In 2019, the current car bridge was deemed unsafe and closed to all traffic.

References

Unincorporated communities in Powder River County, Montana
Unincorporated communities in Montana